Ethel Mary Nucella Williams (8 July 1863 – 29 January 1948) was born in Cromer, and attended Norwich High School for Girls and Newnham College, Cambridge.

Ethel attended the London School of Medicine for Women and graduated in 1891. She had to gain her hospital experience abroad in Paris and Vienna, because at that time women were not permitted to train in British hospitals, and qualified in 1895.

Williams was the first female doctor in Newcastle upon Tyne, and in 1906, she became the first woman to found a general medical practice in the city, where she worked alongside Dr Ethel Bentham. 

In 1917, she co-founded the Northern Women's Hospital, which is now the Nuffield Health Clinic on Osborne Road. She retired in 1924 and left her practice to another female doctor, Dr Mona MacNaughton. Ethel was also one of the initial members of the Medical Women's Federation.

Ethel Williams was Secretary of the Newcastle Women's Liberal Association, a member of the Literary and Philosophical Society, and served as a Justice of the Peace.

Her obituary in the British Medical Journal also states 'She distinguished herself in 1906 by being one of the first women in the North of England to drive a motor-car.'

Williams was the lifelong companion of Frances Hardcastle, an English mathematician and one of the founding members of the American Mathematical Society. Together with Hardcastle she built a house by the Northumberland moors at Stocksfield in which she spent her retirement.

Her suffragist banner from circa 1905 is one of the treasures of Newcastle University Library's Special Collections.

Williams died in 1948, leaving an estate valued at £31,659, . In 1950, Newcastle University opened new student accommodation named the Ethel Williams Halls of Residence in her memory. This building was demolished in the late 1990s and the residential street now occupying the site is called Williams Park.

In 2018, a plaque was placed at a house where she lived in Newcastle's Osborne Terrace, which reads, "ETHEL WILLIAMS  / 1862-1948 / Lived and worked here 1910-1924. / Newcastle's first female general medical practitioner / A radical suffragist, pacifist, educationalist and / social welfare campaigner / Co-founded both / the Northern Women's Hospital and / the Medical Women's Federation / in 1917."

References

British suffragists
British pacifists
1863 births
1948 deaths
Alumni of Newnham College, Cambridge
People from Cromer
English women medical doctors